Bill Porter (born October 3, 1943) is an American author who translates under the pen-name Red Pine. He is a translator of Chinese texts, primarily Taoist and Buddhist, including poetry and sūtras. In 2018, he won the American Academy of Arts & Letters Thornton Wilder Prize for translation.

Early life
In an interview with Andy Ferguson for Tricycle Magazine in 2000, Red Pine revealed some of the details of his early life.  His father, Arnold Porter, grew up on a cotton farm in Arkansas. At an early age, he became part of a notorious bank robbing gang that robbed banks from the south northwards to Michigan. In a shoot out with the police, all the gang members were killed except Porter who was wounded and subsequently sent to prison.  Nevertheless, after six years he was pardoned by the governor of Michigan and released; an inheritance from the sale of the family farm allowed him to enter the hotel business and to become a multimillionaire. Porter moved to Los Angeles, where Bill was born in 1943. Later the family moved to a mountainous area near Coeur D’Alene Idaho. Arnold Porter became involved in Democratic Party politics and head of the Democratic Party in California, developing close associations with the Kennedy family.

Pine’s early life was one of wealth and privilege.  He and his siblings were sent to elite private schools, but he considered the schools to be phony and too wrapped in wealth, ego, and power. Eventually his father divorced his mother and subsequently they lost everything. While his brother and sister found it difficult to live with less money, Pine was relieved when this happened.

Pine served in Germany for three years as a medical clerk, which paid for his college education at UC Santa Barbara where he obtained a degree in anthropology. When he encountered Buddhism, the tenets were quite clear to him and he understood exactly what it was about. Following graduation, he went on to graduate studies in language (Chinese) and anthropology at Columbia University, but dropped out in 1972 to go to the Fo Guang Shan in Taiwan, a Buddhist monastery. 

After a year he left and spent the next two and half years at the College of Chinese Culture, a smaller, less crowded monastery outside of Taipei in the mountains where he became a graduate student in philosophy.

Writings
In the years following, he lived in Taiwan and Hong Kong. After 1989 he traveled extensively in China, both as a journalist and on his own. He adopted a Chinese art name, "Red Pine" (赤松 "Chi Song"), after the legendary Taoist immortal. In 1993, after 22 years in East Asia, he returned to the US. In 1999 and 2000, he taught Buddhism and Taoism at the City of Ten Thousand Buddhas. He now lives in Port Townsend, Washington.

His book Road to Heaven prompted Edward A. Burger to seek out and study with Buddhist hermits in the Zhongnan mountains of China and direct the 2005 film Amongst White Clouds.

In 2009, Copper Canyon Press published his translation of Laozi's Tao Te Ching. One of the most noteworthy aspects of this translation is Porter's use of excerpts from China's vast and rich commentarial tradition.

In 2012, he published a translation of the Laṅkāvatāra Sūtra (Lankavatara Sutra: Translation and Commentary. Counterpoint, 2012.) It is based on several early Chinese and Sanskrit translations including the Chinese translation made by Guṇabhadra in 443.

2014 brought a re-translation of The Mountain Poems of Stonehouse (石屋禅师山居诗). Stonehouse (石屋禅师) was a fourteenth century Zen master who wrote his poems late in life while living alone in a Chinese mountain hut.

Yellow River Odyssey is an account in photographs and text of Porter's early 1990s travels along the Yellow River from its mouth at the Yellow Sea to its source in the Tibetan Plateau. Along the way, Porter visited historical religious sites related to Confucius, Mencius, Laozi and Zhuang Zhou. The Chinese version was based on 1991 radio scripts for Hong Kong radio station Metro News.

"The Silk Road: Taking the bus to Pakistan" details the author's overland journey with his friend Finn Wilcox from Xi'an to Islamabad by bus, train, and plane.  It's a first-person account of scenery, artifacts, and people along the northern route of the Silk Road.

Works
 P’u Ming’s Oxherding Pictures and Verses Empty Bowl, 1983. (translator) (see: Ten Bulls)
 Cold Mountain Poems Copper Canyon Press, 1983. (translator) (see: Hanshan (poet))
 Mountain Poems of Stonehouse Empty Bowl, 1985. (translator) (see: Shiwu)
 The Zen Teaching of Bodhidharma Empty Bowl, 1987; North Point Press, 1989. (translator) (see: Bodhidharma)
 Road to Heaven: Encounters with Chinese Hermits  Mercury House, 1993. (author) 
 Guide to Capturing a Plum Blossom by Sung Po-jen. Mercury House, 1995. (translator) 
 Lao-tzu's Taoteching: with Selected Commentaries of the Past 2000 Years Mercury House, 1996. (translator and editor)
 The Zen Works of Stonehouse: Poems and Talks of a Fourteenth-Century Chinese Hermit Mercury House, 1997. (translator) (see: Shiwu)
 The Clouds Should Know Me by Now: Buddhist Poet Monks of China Wisdom Publications, 1998.  (editor, with Mike O'Connor; and contributing translator) (see: Jia Dao, Hanshan Deqing)
 The Collected Songs of Cold Mountain Copper Canyon Press, 2000. (translator and editor)
 Diamond Sutra Counterpoint, 2001 (translator and extensive commentary) (see: Diamond Sutra)
 Poems of the Masters: China's Classic Anthology of T'ang and Sung Dynasty Verse Copper Canyon Press, 2003. (translator) (see: Three Hundred Tang Poems)
 The Heart Sutra: the Womb of Buddhas Washington: Shoemaker & Hoard, 2004. (translator with extensive commentary) (see: Heart Sutra)
 The Platform Sutra : the Zen teaching of Hui-neng Counterpoint, 2006.  (translator with extensive commentary) (see: Platform Sutra)
 Zen Baggage: A Pilgrimage to China Counterpoint, 2008. (author) 
 In Such Hard Times: The Poetry of Wei Ying-wu Copper Canyon Press, July 1, 2009. (translator). Awarded 2007 PEN Translation Fund Grant from PEN American Center. Winner of the American Literary Translators Association's inaugural Lucien Stryk Asian Translation Prize in 2010. (see: Wei Yingwu)
 Lao-tzu's Taoteching: Translated by Red Pine with selected commentaries from the past 2000 years revised edition, Copper Canyon Press, 2009.
Guide to Capturing a Plum Blossom by Sung Po-jen Copper Canyon Press, 2011 (translator) 
 The Lankavatara Sutra: Translation and Commentary Counterpoint, 2012, (translator)
The Mountain Poems of Stonehouse Copper Canyon Press, 2014, (translator)
Yellow River Odyssey Chin Music Press 2014 
"The Silk Road"  Counterpoint 2016 
"Paradise of the Mind", CITIC Publishing, May 2018, translated by Li Xin
A Shaman’s Lament, Empty Bowl, 2021, (translator). See: Li Sao.

References

External links
 Bill Porter (Red Pine) author page at Copper Canyon Press
 Many poems translated from Chinese by Red Pine/Bill Porter 
 Interview with Bill Porter published in Tricycle
 Red Pine author page at Counterpoint Press

American Buddhists
Buddhist translators
Living people
1943 births
Translators of Taoist texts
Writers from Port Townsend, Washington
20th-century American translators
21st-century American translators
University of California, Santa Barbara alumni
Columbia University alumni
20th-century pseudonymous writers
21st-century pseudonymous writers